Apogonichthys is a genus of cardinalfishes native to the Indian Ocean and the western Pacific Ocean.

Species
The recognized species in this genus are:

 Apogonichthys landoni Herre, 1934
 Apogonichthys ocellatus (M. C. W. Weber, 1913) (ocellated cardinalfish)
 Apogonichthys perdix Bleeker, 1854 (Perdix cardinalfish)

Other authorities recognise an additional two species, Apogonichthys heptastygma and Apogonichthys waikiki, although FishBase only recognises the above three.

References

Apogoninae
Marine fish genera
Taxa named by Pieter Bleeker